Oliver Wilton Willars (born 25 June 1990) known as Ollie Willars is an English field hockey player who plays as a defender for Dutch club
HGC. He played a total of 138 matches for the England and Great Britain  national teams, from 2012 until 2019.

Club career

In March 2021 it was announced that he will join Dutch Hoofdklasse club HGC for the 2021–22 season.

Willars has been playing club hockey in the Men's England Hockey League Premier Division for Beeston.
He joined the club when he was 12 years old.

International career
He competed for England in the men's hockey tournament at the 2014 Commonwealth Games where he won a bronze medal.

In April 2021 he announced his retirement from international hockey.

References

External links

1990 births
Living people
Commonwealth Games bronze medallists for England
English male field hockey players
Male field hockey defenders
Field hockey players at the 2014 Commonwealth Games
Field hockey players at the 2018 Commonwealth Games
Commonwealth Games medallists in field hockey
Beeston Hockey Club players
Men's England Hockey League players
Men's Hoofdklasse Hockey players
HGC players
Medallists at the 2014 Commonwealth Games
Medallists at the 2018 Commonwealth Games